Motherland is a 2010 independent documentary film directed and written by Owen 'Alik Shahadah. Motherland is the sequel to the 2005 documentary 500 Years Later.

Synopsis
Motherland is a documentary about the African continent from Ancient Egypt to the present. It is an overview of African history and contemporary issues but with the African people at the centre of the story.

Awards 
 2011 Nominated Best Diaspora Documentary African Movie Academy Award (2011)
 Best Documentary Zanzibar International Film Festival (2010)
 Best Board of directors award for Documentary Pan-African Film Festival (2010)

Cast 
The cast features key figures from the African political world.
Barack Obama stock footage from visit to Africa
Harry Belafonte
Rohan Marley, son of Bob Marley and member of the Rastafari Movement
Amiri Baraka
Abdulkadir Ahmed Said, Somali filmmaker
Maulana Karenga
Jacob Zuma, President of South Africa
Frances Cress Welsing
Molefi Kete Asante
Kimani Nehusi
Chen Chimutengwende, Minister of Information and Publicity Zimbabwe
 Omowale Clay
Meles Zenawi, late Prime Minister of Ethiopia
David Commissiong
Ali Mazrui
Mohamed Ibn Chambas, President of the Economic Community of West African States (ECOWAS) Commission
Haki R. Madhubuti
Hakim Adi
Nicole Lee, TransAfrica Forum
Tsedenia Gebremarkos
Zanele Hlatshwayo, Mayor of Pietermaritzburg
Gamal Nkrumah, son of Ghana's first President Kwame Nkrumah
Jeff Radebe, African National Congress
Hakim Quick
Didymus Mutasa, ZANU-PF
Abune Paulos, Patriarch of Ethiopian Orthodox Church
Esther Stanford
Kwesi Kwaa Prah
S'bu Ndebele
Ali Moussa Iye, UNESCO
Adama Samassékou
Desmond Tutu (deleted by directors)

5.1 surround 
Motherland is mixed in 5.1 Dolby Digital Surround.

See also 
 Pan-Africanism
 African history
 African holocaust
 Maafa
 List of films featuring slavery

References

External links 
 
 

2010 films
Works about Africa
Films about American slavery
American independent films
Films set in Africa
English-language Malian films
Amharic-language films
Documentary films about African politics
2010 documentary films
Documentary films about slavery in the United States
Pan-Africanism
Films directed by Owen 'Alik Shahadah
Films shot in Ethiopia
Films shot in Sudan
Films shot in South Africa
Films shot in Senegal
Films shot in Egypt
Films shot in Ghana
Films shot in Zimbabwe
Films shot in Mali
Films shot in Nigeria
Desmond Tutu
2010s English-language films
2010s American films
2010 multilingual films
American multilingual films